Justine Henin-Hardenne was the defending champion, but chose not to participate that year.

Lindsay Davenport won the final, beating Jelena Janković, 6–4, 3–6, 6–4.

Singles results

Seeds
The top four seeds received a bye into the second round.

Draw

Finals

Top half

Bottom half

Qualifying

Seeds

Qualifiers

Draw

First qualifier

Second qualifier

Third qualifier

Fourth qualifier

References

External links
 2005 Dubai Championship at wtatennis.com

2005 Dubai Tennis Championships
Dubai Tennis Championships